Mikhail Ivanovich Bychkov (May 22, 1926 – May 17, 1997) was a Russian ice hockey player who played in the Soviet Hockey League.

He was born in Lyubertsy, Soviet Union.

Bychkov played for Krylya Sovetov Moscow and was inducted into the Russian and Soviet Hockey Hall of Fame in 1954.

External links
 Russian and Soviet Hockey Hall of Fame bio

1926 births
1997 deaths
Krylya Sovetov Moscow players
Ice hockey players at the 1960 Winter Olympics
Olympic bronze medalists for the Soviet Union
Olympic ice hockey players of the Soviet Union
Olympic medalists in ice hockey
People from Lyubertsy
Medalists at the 1960 Winter Olympics
Sportspeople from Moscow Oblast